Domnica Manole (born 4 June 1961) is a Moldovan judge. She has served as the President of the Constitutional Court of Moldova since April 2020.

References 

1961 births
Living people
Constitutional Court of Moldova judges